The Zamfara River is a river in the northern part of Nigeria.

There are various names for the Zamfara in different regions that it flows through. Some of the most common ones include Gulbi Gindi, Gulbi Zamfara, River Zamfara, and River Gindi. The river is at latitude 12°2'2.22" and longitude: 4°2'22.85"

References

Rivers of Nigeria